Cynthia Harnett (22 June 1893 – 25 October 1981) was an English author and illustrator, mainly of children's books. She is best known for six historical novels that feature ordinary teenage children involved in events of national significance, four of them in the 15th century. They are characterised by meticulous background research and vivid evocation of history. 

For one of them, The Wool-Pack (1951), she won the Carnegie Medal from the Library Association, recognising the year's best children's book by a British subject. Another, The Load of Unicorn (1959), was a commended runner-up for the Carnegie Medal.

Life

Cynthia Harnett was born in London and studied at Chelsea School of Art. She illustrated the early editions of several of her own novels, but she also collaborated more than a dozen times with the painter and etcher George Vernon Stokes (1873–1954). Several of their books about dogs, the countryside or both credit Stokes and Harnett as co-authors.

Works

With (George) Vernon Stokes
 In Praise of Dogs: An Anthology in Prose and Verse (Country Life, 1936), compiled by C.M. Harnett, illustrated by George Vernon Stokes 
 David's New World: The Making of a Sportsman (Country Life, 1937) 
 The Pennymakers (Eyre & Spottiswoode, 1937) 
 Junk, the Puppy (Blackie & Son, 1937) 
 Banjo the Puppy (1938) 
 Velvet Nasks (Medici Society, 1938), illus. Vernon Stokes 
 To Be A Farmer's Boy (Blackie & Son, 1940) 
 Mudlarks (Collins, 1940) 
 Mountaineers (Collins, 1941) 
 Ducks and Drakes (Collins, 1942) 
 The Bob-Tail Pup (Collins, 1944) 
 Sand Hoppers (Collins, 1946) 
 Getting to Know Dogs (Collins, 1947), illus. Vernon Stokes 
 Two and a Bit (Collins, 1948)
 Follow my Leader (Collins, 1949) 
 Pets Limited (Collins, 1950) 

Historical novels
These six books were published by Methuen and the first five were illustrated by Harnett.
 The Great House (1949) —set in London and the countryside in the 17th century 
 The Wool-Pack (1951) —set in the Cotswolds in 1493 
 Ring Out Bow Bells! (1953) —set in London in 1415 
 Stars of Fortune (1956) —set in 1554
 The Load of Unicorn (1959) —set in London in 1482
 The Writing on the Hearth (1971), illus. Gareth Floyd —set in the 1430s

In the U.S. these six books were first published as 
The Great House (1968),
Nicholas and the Wool-Pack (1953),
The Drawbridge Gate (1953),
Stars of Fortune (1956),
Caxton's Challenge (1960),
and The Writing on the Hearth (1973).
At least three were re-titled again in the 1980s.

Others
 The Green Popinjay (Blackwell, 1955) 
 A Fifteenth-Century Wool Merchant (Oxford, 1962) 
 Monasteries & Monks (B. T. Batsford, 1963), illus. Edward Osmond

See also

Notes

References

External links
"The Historical Stories of Cynthia Harnett"

1893 births
1981 deaths
Alumni of Chelsea College of Arts
Artists from London
Carnegie Medal in Literature winners
English children's writers
English historical novelists
Writers from London
Writers who illustrated their own writing
Place of death missing
Writers of historical fiction set in the Middle Ages
Writers of historical fiction set in the early modern period